Bozankaya is a Turkish manufacturer of rolling stock including metro, tram and trolleybus vehicles.

History 
The company was originally founded as BBC & C in Wolfenbüttel, Germany by Murat Bozankaya.  The company moved its headquarters to Ankara, Turkey in 2003.

Customers

Metros 
 BTS Skytrain, Bangkok, Thailand — EMU-A2 trains in a joint venture with Siemens

Trams 
 AntRay, Antalya, Turkey
 CTP Iași, Iași, Romania
 Kayseray, Kayseri, Turkey
 STPT, Timișoara, Romania

Trolleybuses 
 Malatya, Turkey

Products

Electricity bus 
 Sileo:
 Sileo S10
 Sileo S12
 Sileo S18
 Sileo S25

Metro

Tram

Trambus

References

External links 
 Bozankaya

Manufacturing companies based in Ankara
Rail vehicle manufacturers of Turkey